The concealer moth genus invalidly named Thalamarchis by Meyrick in 1904 has been renamed Thalamarchella.

Thalamarchis is a genus of grass moths (family Crambidae). It is monotypic, with a single species Thalamarchis chalchorma. It is known from Sangir in the Malay Archipelago.

The wingspan is about 16 mm.

References
  (2004): Butterflies and Moths of the World, Generic Names and their Type-species – Thalamarchis. Version of 2004-NOV-05. Retrieved 2010-APR-24.

Crambinae
Taxa named by Edward Meyrick
Monotypic moth genera
Moths of Asia
Crambidae genera